The Sixty-fifth Session of the United Nations General Assembly was the session of the United Nations General Assembly that ran from 14 September 2010 to 12 September 2011.

The theme of the session was "Reaffirming the central role of the United Nations in global governance."

Organisation

President 
On 11 June 2010, Swiss diplomat and politician Joseph Deiss of was elected by acclamation to the position of President of the General Assembly. Mr. Deiss was elected from the Western European and Others Group (WEOG).

In his first speech as President-elect of the General Assembly, Mr. Deiss laid out some of his priorities for the session. These included: the achievement of the Millennium Development Goals, as well as sustainable economic growth.
Additionally, he stated that the General Assembly would need to address: climate change, food security, reconstruction of fragile and post-conflict States, human rights, humanitarian aid and disarmament.

Vice-Presidents 
The following were appointed to be the Session's vice-presidents on the 11 June 2010:

The five permanent members of the Security Council:
 
 
 
  
 

As well as the following nations:

Committees

Seat allocation 
As is tradition, before each session of the General Assembly, the Secretary-General draws lots to determine which Member State would occupy the first seat in the General Assembly Hall for the Session, with other Member States following according to the English translation of their name. For the 65th Session, Guinea was chosen to take the first seat of the General Assembly Chamber.

General debate 

The General Debate of the 65th Session was held between 23 and 29 September 2010, with the exception of the intervening Sunday. At the General debate, Member States have the opportunity to lay out the issues that are most concerning to them, as well as their hopes as to what the General Assembly will do during the Session.

The order of speakers is given first to Member States, then Observer States and supranational bodies. Speakers are put on a speaking list in the order of their request, with special consideration for ministers and other government officials of similar or higher rank. According to the rules in place for the General Debate, the statements should be in one of the United Nations official languages of Arabic, Chinese, English, French, Russian or Spanish, and will be translated by the United Nations translators.

References

External links 
 Website of the 65th Session

Sessions of the United Nations General Assembly
2010 in the United Nations
2011 in the United Nations